The Russian Athletics Championships is an annual outdoor track and field competition organised by the All-Russia Athletic Federation (ARAF), which serves as the Russian national championship for the sport. The competition was first held in 1908, during the time of the Russian Empire. The competition had nine editions during this period, lasting up to 1916, at which point it was ceased as a result of the October Revolution and was effectively replaced in 1920 by the inauguration of the Soviet Athletics Championships. During this period, separate championships for the Russian Soviet Federative Socialist Republic were occasionally held (with the first two editions occurring in 1922 and 1927 in Moscow), though mostly the Russian championships was merged into the larger Soviet one. After the dissolution of the Soviet Union in 1991, Russia was restored as an independent country and the Russian Athletics Championships was re-initiated, starting from 1992 after a shared CIS Athletics Championships in 1991.

Men

100 metres

200 metres

400 metres

800 metres

1500 metres

5000 metres

10,000 metres

Half marathon

Marathon

24-hour run
1993: Nikolay Safin
1994: Eduard Khikov
1995: Ivan Bogdanov
1996: Ivan Bogdanov
1997: Timur Abzalov
1998: Sergey Ishmulkin
1999: Nasibula Khusnullin
2000: Andrey Kazantsev
2001: Ivan Labutin
2002: Vladimir Romanov
2003: Dmitriy Tishin
2004: Vladimir Bychkov
2005: Timur Abzalov

3000 metres steeplechase

110 metres hurdles

400 metres hurdles

High jump

Pole vault

Long jump

Triple jump

Shot put

Discus throw

Hammer throw

Javelin throw

Decathlon

20 kilometres walk

50 kilometres walk

Women

100 metres

200 metres

400 metres

800 metres

1500 metres

5000 metres

10,000 metres

Half marathon

Marathon

24-hour run
1994: Svetlana Savoskina
1995: Nadezhda Tarasova
1996: Rimma Paltseva
1997: Yelena Sidorenkova
1998: Irina Reutovich
1999: Irina Reutovich
2000: Irina Reutovich
2001: Lyudmila Kalinina
2002: Lyudmila Kalinina
2003: Galina Yeremina
2004: Galina Yeremina
2005: Lyudmila Kalinina

3000 metres steeplechase

100 metres hurdles

400 metres hurdles

High jump

Pole vault

Long jump

Triple jump

Shot put

Discus throw

Hammer throw

Javelin throw

Heptathlon

Racewalking

References

Champions 1992–2006
Russian Championships. GBR Athletics. Retrieved 2021-02-05.

Winners
 List
Russian Championships
Athletics